The Bassoon Sonata in G major, Op. 168, was written by Camille Saint-Saëns in 1921 as one of his last works. This bassoon sonata is the last of the three sonatas that Saint-Saëns composed for wind instruments, the other two being the Oboe Sonata (Op. 166) and the Clarinet Sonata (Op. 167), written the same year. These works were part of Saint-Saëns's efforts to expand the repertoire for instruments for which hardly any solo parts were written, as he confided to his friend Jean Chantavoine in a letter dated to 15 April 1921: "At the moment I am concentrating my last reserves on giving rarely considered instruments the chance to be heard."

Structure 

The work consists of three movements. A performance takes approximately 13 minutes.

Reception 
The musical scholar Jean Gallois calls the Bassoon Sonata "a model of transparency, vitality and lightness", containing humorous touches but also moments of peaceful contemplation.

References

External links 
 
 , performed by Francesco Bossone and Akanè Makita

Chamber music by Camille Saint-Saëns
S
1921 compositions
Compositions in G major